Dimanches à l'Élysée (Sundays at the Élysée) is the fifth live album by Alain Bashung, issued posthumously in November 2009 on Barclay Records. It documents the 2008-2009 tour which followed the album Bleu pétrole.

Production 
Dimanches à l'Élysée documents the tour that Alain Bashung did in 2008-2009 while fighting with the cancer that led to his death on 14 March 2009. The album features most of the songs from Bleu pétrole, with around fifteen more songs showcasing his career.

The album was mostly recorded on 14 December 2008 at the Élysée Montmartre in Paris.

Track listing

Personnel

Musicians 
 Bobby Jocky - bass guitar
 Arnaud Dieterlen - drums
 Yan Péchin - guitar
 Jeff Assy - cello

2009 live albums
Barclay (record label) live albums
Alain Bashung albums